In Australian culture, a seachange (or sea change) is a form of human migration where individuals abandon city living for a perceived easier life in rural coastal communities. The term was popularised by ABC TV series SeaChange, which prompted city-dwellers to escape to the coast as depicted by the series. The term originally comes from Shakespeare's The Tempest. The result of this phenomenon was a rapid boom in tourism and real estate development in coastal areas, particularly in New South Wales.

A similar term, treechange, describes the movement of urban people to the countryside.
The term "Tree Change" was first coined by ABC Ballarat radio mornings presenter Steve Martin on his radio talk back show after his five question morning challenge.

SeaChange TV series

In television series SeaChange, which originally ran 1998 to 2000, the main character Laura Gibson fulfils her escapist desire by leaving the city for a small seaside town after her career and family life in Melbourne falls apart. The series was one of the most popular programmes in Australia. The primary filming location was Barwon Heads on the Bellarine Peninsula.

Who is shifting
People shifting to the coast have been characterised as:
Free agent migrators
Include retirees
Majority are of working age, drawn to service the needs of retirees and tourists
Sub categories include pre-retirees, alternative lifestylers and internet business operators
Forced relocating migrants
Principally people reliant on income support including unemployed, single parents and the disabled.

Effect
The rate of growth in rural coastal areas in 2008 was 60% higher than the national average. Almost six million people already resided in coastal areas outside the mainland capitals in 2008. In addition to people seeking a better lifestyle, the seachange phenomenon is driven by retiring baby boomers and people forced out of capital cities by high house prices.  

In response to the influx of tourists and new residents to their jurisdictions, coastal councils from around Australia formed the National Sea Change Taskforce in 2004 to seek ways to ensure sustainable development in their communities. As at 2008 there are 68 member councils from around Australia collectively representing more than four million residents.

See also
 Elbow roomers, people who leave a city for the countryside to seek more land and greater freedom from governmental and neighborhood interference
 Counterurbanization

References

Further reading
Seeking Authenticity in Place, Culture, and the Self: The Great Urban Escape
Boomtown 2050: Scenarios for a Rapidly Growing City.

External links

National Sea Change Taskforce
The Effect of Living the 'Sea Change' Dream

21st century in Australia
Demographics of Australia
Real estate in Australia
Television in Australia